Netaji Subhas Mahavidyalaya, also known as Haldibari College, established in 1985, is general degree college in Haldibari, India. It offers undergraduate courses in arts and commerce. The campus is in the Cooch Behar district. It is affiliated to Cooch Behar Panchanan Barma University.

Departments

Arts and Commerce
Bengali ( & Pass)
English (& Pass)
History (& Pass)
Political Science (& Pass)
Philosophy (& Pass)
Economics (Pass only)
Commerce
Sociology (Pass only)
Geography (& Pass)

Accreditation
The college is recognized by the University Grants Commission (UGC).

History
Netaji Subhas Mahavidyalaya was established in 1985. The original campus was donated by Haldibari Girls High School. Most local inhabitants are farmers and belong to a scheduled caste (67%). Its first students enrolled on 18 November 1985 to study Arts Stream. The college was accredited by the National Assessment and Accreditation Council (NAAC) in March 2006

Campus 
The college is situated near the Indo-Bangladesh border in a semi-urban area.

This institution is co-ed. It is affiliated to the University of North Bengal. The college has NSS wing. 

The college offers a grievance redress cell, an employment counselling cell and health care facilities. It offers remedial coaching. and has been awarded a C++ Certification.

Funding 
It receives grant-in-aid from the Government of West Bengal. In 1992 it was included under section 2(f) and 12(B) category of the University Grants Commission. Other funds come from MP's, Local Area Development Fund, MLA's BEUP Scheme and from various departments of the government of West Bengal.

See also

References

External links
Netaji Subhas Mahavidyalaya

Universities and colleges in Cooch Behar district
Colleges affiliated to Cooch Behar Panchanan Barma University
Academic institutions formerly affiliated with the University of North Bengal
Memorials to Subhas Chandra Bose
Educational institutions established in 1985
1985 establishments in West Bengal